Hendrik Nielsen (1 June 1942 – 4 September 2022) was a Greenlandic politician. A member of Siumut, he served on the Greenland Provincial Council from 1974 to 1979 and its successor, the Inatsisartut, from 1979 to 1991.

Nielsen died on 4 September 2022, at the age of 80.

References

1942 births
2022 deaths
20th-century Greenlandic politicians
Members of the Parliament of Greenland
Siumut politicians
People from Kujalleq